Akwa may refer to:

People
 Akwá, Fabrice Akwa (born 1977), Angolan footballer
 Obed Akwa, Ghanaian soldier
 People from Akwa Ibom, Nigeria
 People from Akwa Akpa, Nigeria

Places
 Akwa, Douala, a district in Douala, Cameroon
 Stade Akwa, a multi-use stadium in Douala, Cameroon
 Akwa Ibom State, a Nigerian state
 Akwa Akpa, a city-state in present-day Nigeria

Other uses
 Akwa Group, a Moroccan conglomerate
Akwa language, a Bantu language of the Republic of Congo